Howard Randolph Bayne (May 11, 1851 in Winchester, Frederick County, Virginia – March 13, 1933 in New Brighton, Staten Island, New York City) was an American lawyer, historian and politician from New York.

Life
Bayne was born in 1851 in Winchester, Virginia. He began his education at the Squire's School in Richmond, Virginia from which he matriculated to Richmond College (now the University of Richmond) and law at the University of Virginia.  Early in his career he taught at the University School in Richmond and Pampatike Academy in King William County. In 1879 he was admitted to the bar and formed a partnership with James Ashton Cabell, Cabell & Bayne. Bayne dissolved the firm in 1882 when he moved to Staten Island.

Bayne married in 1886 in Richmond, Virginia, to Elizabeth S. Moore, of Texas. The couple had two sons and one daughter. Bayne and his wife resided in the New Brighton area of Staten Island. Their former home is now owned by writer Darwin Porter and partner Danforth Price.

In February 1896, he ran as an Independent Democrat for Supervisor of the Town of Castleton, but was defeated by the regular Democratic candidate. Later that year he joined the Gold Democrats.

Bayne was a member of the New York State Senate (23rd D.) from 1909 to 1912, sitting in the 132nd, 133rd, 134th and 135th New York State Legislatures. He was Chairman of the Committee on the Judiciary, and Chairman of the Senate Committee to investigate the city and county of Albany. He also served as member of senate committees on villages, agriculture, internal affairs of towns and counties, privileges and elections; forest, fish and game; commerce and navigation, and codes.

He died on March 13, 1933, at his home at 75 St. Mark's Place in New Brighton, Staten Island.

Writings
Bayne was an avid writer throughout his life writing a number of news articles and books focusing on colonial, military and legal history and well as regional impressions. He wrote for the Richmond Times Dispatch under the pseudonym 'Ego and Alter' and also for the Railroad Gazette and the Society of Colonial Wars. Some of his works are;

 Addresses During the Final Exercises, June 7–11, 1914
 The Application of the Monroe Doctrine
 A rebellion in the Colony of Virginia
 The Buckners of Virginia and the Allied Families of Strother and Ashby
 George Washington, His Administration as President
 The Settlement of Jamestown
 The Year 1619 in the Colony of Virginia

Societies and Organizations
Bayne was a member of the Greek letter society, Beta Theta Phi, the Colonnade Club of the University of Virginia, Richmond County Country Club, New York City Bar Association, New York State Bar Association, Society of Cincinnati, Society of Colonial Wars, Sons of the Revolution, Virginia Historical Society. The Virginians of New York, New York Southern Society, Staten Island Association of Arts and Sciences, Reform Club of New York City, Fort Orange Club, the Prohibition Commission of the State of New York and New York State Employers' Liability Commission.

Ancestry
Bayne was a descendant of William Thornton (immigrant) and distant cousin of U.S. Presidents James Madison and Zachary Taylor as well as explorer Meriwether Lewis.

References
 Baird, William Raimond, Betas of achievement: being brief biographical records of members of the Beta Theta Pi who have achieved distinction in various fields of endeavor, The Beta publishing Co., New York, 1913.
 Dwight, Melatiah Everett (editor), The New York Genealogical and Biographical Record, Volume 36, New York Genealogical and Biographical Society, New York, NY, 1905.
 Tyler, Lyon Gardner, Encyclopedia of Virginia Biography, Under the Editorial Supervision of Lyon Gardiner Tyler, Vol. 4., Lewis Historical Publishing Company, New York, 1915.
 Williams, Clark (editor), Documents of the Assembly of the State of New York, Volume 24, New York State Legislature Assembly, J.B. LKyon Press. Albany, N.Y., 1908.

Footnotes

External links
 
 His house in Saint George by David Goldfarb & James G. Ferreri ("Images of America" series, Arcadia Publishing, 2009, pg. 63)

1851 births
1933 deaths
Politicians from Winchester, Virginia
University of Richmond alumni
Democratic Party New York (state) state senators
General Society of Colonial Wars
Historians from New York (state)
Politicians from Staten Island
Historians from Virginia